Isaac dos Santos Moraes (26 July 1914 – 12 December 1993) was an Olympic freestyle swimmer from Brazil, who participated at two Summer Olympics for his native country. At the 1932 Summer Olympics in Los Angeles, he swam the 4×200-metre freestyle, finishing 7th in the final, along with Manuel Silva, Manoel Villar and Benevenuto Nunes. At the 1936 Summer Olympics in Berlin, he swam the 100-metre and 4×200-metre freestyle, not reaching the finals.

References

1914 births
1993 deaths
Brazilian male freestyle swimmers
Olympic swimmers of Brazil
Swimmers at the 1932 Summer Olympics
Swimmers at the 1936 Summer Olympics
20th-century Brazilian people